As Duke of Cornwall, Prince of Wales and later as King, Charles III has been one of the United Kingdom's most important ambassadors. He travels overseas as a representative of the UK and also undertakes tours of Commonwealth realms. He is often accompanied by his wife, Queen Camilla.

As Duke of Cornwall

As Prince of Wales

1960s

1970s

1980s

1990s

2000s

2010s

2020s

As King 
Upcoming visits

See also 
 List of state visits made by Elizabeth II
 List of Commonwealth visits made by Elizabeth II
 List of official overseas trips made by William, Prince of Wales, and Catherine, Princess of Wales
 List of official overseas trips made by Prince Harry, Duke of Sussex, and Meghan, Duchess of Sussex

References 

Charles III
Foreign relations of the United Kingdom
Personal timelines
Royal visits